Sir George Richard Dibbs KCMG (12 October 1834 – 5 August 1904) was an Australian politician who was Premier of New South Wales on three occasions.

Early years
Dibbs was born in Sydney, son of Captain John Dibbs, who 'disappeared' in the same year. He was educated at the Australian College under Dr Lang, obtained a position as a young man in a Sydney wine merchant's business, and afterwards was in partnership as a merchant with a brother. In 1857, he married Anne Maria Robey. He travelled abroad, and established a branch in Valparaiso in 1865, which involved running a Spanish blockade during the Chincha Islands War. In 1867 his business failed and he went bankrupt, but eight years later called his one time creditors together and paid them all in full.

Political career

Dibbs entered parliament in 1874 as MLA for West Sydney, as a supporter of business interests and compulsory, secular and free education, which involved withdrawal of the support from denominational schools, provided under the Education Act of 1866. He opposed the first ministry of Henry Parkes on this issue and was loosely associated with the third ministry of John Robertson, but fell out with Robertson, denouncing his education bill as a sham and betrayal, returning to support Parkes. He lost his seat at the 1877 election due to his support for assisted immigration, which gave him a reputation as an "enemy of labour". Subsequently, a seamen's strike broke out against the Australian Steam Navigation Co, because it had begun to employ Chinese sailors on the Australian coast, and he was obliged as a director of the company to defend its policy, further reducing his popularity.

In 1880 John Shepherd commenced the great slander case against him, claiming that Dibbs had slandered him by saying that Shepherd had committed adultery with the wife of Dibb's brother John. Shepherd obtained judgment for £2000 plus costs, which Dibbs refused to pay and Dibbs was imprisoned at HM Prison Darlinghurst for a year. During his incarceration he was reported in the Sydney Morning Herald as having a suite of rooms, his own manservant to make life tolerable, and a woodworking shop where he made gifts for some 3500 visitors. Ladies decorated his cell with flowers. The woodworking lathe was supplied by Parkes. Dibbs was perceived by the electorate as the virtuous underdog, Shepherd as the villain, and on his release on 6 May 1881, he found his political popularity restored.

In 1882, he won St Leonards, with the support of the unions. In January 1883 he was given the portfolio of Colonial Treasurer in the ministry of Sir Alexander Stuart, and was committed to continued railway-building although revenue was under pressure due to a suspension of land sales and no new taxation. Dibbs would later describe this decision as "the gravest political blunder of my life". The Assembly refused to pass an increase in property tax, so he decided to borrow an unprecedented £14m, giving him a subsequent reputation for extravagance. Stuart resigned due to ill-health in October 1885 and Dibbs became Premier. In the October 1885 elections, he was attacked mercilessly by Parkes who defeated him in the St Leonards election, was defeated for The Richmond, but he won The Murrumbidgee. Although his government polled badly overall, he attempted to govern on, but he was forced to resign after less than three months when it became clear that there would be a budget deficit of over £1m.

Dibbs was Colonial Secretary in the ministry of Sir Patrick Jennings from February 1886 to January 1887. Dibbs was a free trader, however the government introduced an ad valorem tax of 5%, which Dibbs denied was a protective tariff. Parkes formed the Free Trade Party and fought the 1887 election on the fiscal question of free trade or protection. While Dibbs supported free trade, he opposed Parkes, and stood as an independent free trade candidate. Dibbs was politically isolated and in July 1887 joined the Protectionist Party, becoming leader of the party on 20 September 1887.

He became Premier again on 17 January 1889, but was succeeded by Parkes seven weeks later. When Parkes resigned in October 1891 Dibbs came into power following the 1891 New South Wales election, with Labour support, in a time of great financial stress. He went to England in June 1892 on a borrowing mission, not only as the representative of New South Wales but also of Victoria, South Australia and Tasmania, and carried out his negotiations successfully. During the banking crisis of May 1893 he showed himself to be a firm leader, saving the situation at Sydney by giving the banks power to issue inconvertible paper money for a period, although most of them failed to take advantage and went bankrupt. In 1893, his electoral reform removed rural over-representation. He was elected as the member for Tamworth in 1894. He later received a substantial public testimonial for his services at this time.

Federation
Dibbs had little influence on the question of federation. He was a member of the 1891 convention and sat on the judiciary committee, but was never more than a lukewarm advocate for it. In June 1894, writing to Sir James Patterson, then Premier of Victoria, he suggested the unification of New South Wales and Victoria, in the hope that the other colonies would join in later on. A few weeks later his ministry was defeated at a general election and George Reid became Premier in August. Dibbs was reconciled with Parkes in 1894, but both lost their seats at the election held in July 1895, having been portrayed as reactionary and unprincipled by Reid.

Later life
Dibbs retired from public life, and was appointed managing trustee of the savings bank of New South Wales. He held this position until his death in the Sydney suburb of Hunters Hill in 1904. He was survived by Lady Dibbs, two sons and nine daughters.

Honours
He was made a Knight Commander of the Order of St Michael and St George (KCMG) in July 1892.

References

 

Premiers of New South Wales
Members of the New South Wales Legislative Assembly
Knights Commander of the Order of St Michael and St George
1834 births
1904 deaths
Treasurers of New South Wales
19th-century Australian politicians